Bernadette is a French name, a female form of the name Bernard, which means "brave bear". Notable persons with the name include:

People 
 Bernadette (singer) (born 1959), Dutch singer
 Bernadette Allen (born 1956), American foreign service officer and ambassador
 Bernadette Banner (born 1994/1995), American-English dress historian and YouTuber
 Bernadette Beauvais (born 1949), French politician
 Bernadette Bowyer (born 1966), Canadian field hockey player
 Bernadette Carroll (1944–2018), American singer, member of the Angels in the 1960s
 Bernadette Castro (born 1944), American businesswoman
 Bernadette Cattanéo (1899-1963), French trade unionist and militant communist
 Bernadette Caulfield, American television producer
 Bernadette Charleux, French polymer chemist
 Bernadette Clement, Canadian politician
 Bernadette Collins, British strategy engineer from Northern Ireland
 Bernadette Cooper, American singer
 Bernadette Coston (born 1989), South African field hockey player
 Bernadette Chirac (born 1933), French politician, wife of former French President Jacques Chirac
 Bernadette Eberlain, German dermatologist, allergologist, and researcher.
 Bernadette Després (born 1941), French illustrator and comic book artist
 Bernadette Graf (born 1992), Austrian judoka
 Bernadette Hall (born 1948), New Zealand playwright and poet
 Bernadette Farrell (born 1957), British hymnographer and composer
 Bernadette Kelly (born 1964), British civil servant
 Bernadette Lafont (1938–2013), French actress
 Bernadette Luciano, New Zealand language and culture academic
 Bernadette Mayer (born 1945), American poet, writer, and visual artist
 Bernadette McDonald (born 1951), Canadian author
 Bernadette Devlin McAliskey (born 1947), Irish political activist
 Bernadette Meehan (born 1975), American diplomat and  nonprofit organization executive
 Bernadette Menu (born 1942), French Egyptologist
 Bernadette Meyler, American law academic
 Bernadette Moriau, French nun whose recovery from a spinal problem was declared a miracle
 Bernadette Nolan (1960–2013), Irish singer and actress
 Bernadette O'Farrell (1924–1999), Irish actress
 Bernadette Pajer, American author
 Bernadette Peters (born 1948), American actress and singer
 Bernadette Quigley (born 1960), American actress
 Bernadette Romulo-Puyat (born 1971), Filipino government official
 Bernadette Roberts (1931–2017), American nun
 Bernadette Sanou Dao (born 1952), Burkinabé author and politician
 Bernadette Sands McKevitt (born 1958), Irish politician
 Bernadette Sanchez (born 1953), American politician 
 Bernadette Schild (born 1990), Austrian ski racer
 Bernadette Seacrest, American vocalist
 Bernadette Sembrano (born 1976), Filipino television reporter, newscaster, and host
 Bernadette Smith, Canadian politician
 Bernadette Strachan (born 1962), English author
 Bernadette Soubirous (1844–1879), also known as Saint Bernadette of Lourdes, French Marian visionary
 Bernadette Speach (born 1948), American composer and pianist
Bernadette Stanislaus (born 1954), American actress and writer known as Bernadette Stanis and Bern Nadette Stanis
 Bernadette Szőcs (born 1995), Romanian table tennis player
 Bernadette Van Roy (born 1948), Belgian middle-distance runner

Fictional characters 
Bernadette Fox, the titular character in the novel Where'd You Go, Bernadette and its film adaptation
Bernadette Rostenkowski, on the American television series The Big Bang Theory
 Bernadette Taylor, in the British television series EastEnders
 Bernadette, in the animated television series Bob and Margaret
 Bernadette Thompson, in the 2014 film Teenage Mutant Ninja Turtles

Animals
 Bernadette (tiger)

See also
 Bernadotte (disambiguation)
 Bernadetta (disambiguation)

French feminine given names